Pyrgomantis rhodesica is a species of praying mantis found in Botswana, Namibia, Transvaal, Zambia, and Zimbabwe.

See also
List of mantis genera and species

References

Pyrgomantis
Mantodea of Africa
Insects described in 1917